Antonella Ruiz Diaz (born 28 December 1996) is an Argentine Paralympic athlete specializing in shot put. She represented Argentina at the 2020 Summer Paralympics.

Career
Diaz represented Argentina in the shot put F41 event at the 2020 Summer Paralympics and won a bronze medal.

References 

1996 births
Living people
Paralympic athletes of Argentina
Medalists at the World Para Athletics Championships
Athletes (track and field) at the 2020 Summer Paralympics
Medalists at the 2020 Summer Paralympics
Paralympic bronze medalists for Argentina
Paralympic medalists in athletics (track and field)
Sportspeople from Entre Ríos Province
Argentine female shot putters
21st-century Argentine women